Events in the year 2000 in Eritrea.

Incumbents 

 President: Isaias Afewerki

Events 

 12 May – United Nations Security Council resolution 1297 was adopted unanimously and demanded an immediate end to hostilities between the country and Ethiopia.

Deaths

References 

 
2000s in Eritrea
Years of the 21st century in Eritrea
Eritrea
Eritrea